Isaia Tuifua (born 24 August 1987 in Samoa) is a Samoan rugby union player. He plays in the inside centre and occasionally on the wing. He played for the provincial based ITM Cup side Taranaki from 2008 to 2014. In 2014 he played for Cardiff Blues in Wales. He also plays for the Samoan national team.
His nickname is Ice.

References

External links
 itsrugby.co.uk profile

1987 births
Samoan rugby union players
Samoa international rugby union players
Taranaki rugby union players
Rugby union centres
Living people
People educated at St Paul's College, Auckland
Cardiff Rugby players
Expatriate rugby union players in Wales
Expatriate rugby union players in France